Finnr's Cane is an atmospheric black metal band from Sudbury, Ontario, Canada, founded in 2008.

The band consists of The Peasant, The Slave, and The Bard, with each self-assigned pseudonym chosen to afford anonymity for the members.

Finnr's Cane's debut album, Wanderlust, was originally released in 2010 through Frostscald Records and later re-released by Prophecy Productions in 2011. Their second album, A Portrait Painted by the Sun, was released in 2013 by Prophecy Productions.

A unique feature of the music of Finnr's Cane is the minimal use of bass guitar, while including cello and flute arrangements.

According to the band members, much of the music of Finnr's Cane is initially created by means of improvisation.

While Finnr's cane have existed solely as a studio project since their inception, The Bard has described a willingness to play live if the right opportunity presented itself.

Band members

 The Peasant 
 The Bard 
 The Slave

Discography
 Wanderlust (2010)
 A Portrait Painted by the Sun (2013)
 Elegy (2018)

References

External links
 
 

Canadian black metal musical groups
Musical groups established in 2008